"Suspicions" is a country music song. It was originally recorded and released as a single in 1979 by Eddie Rabbitt from his album Loveline; his version was a number one hit on the Billboard country music chart and a Top 20 hit on the Billboard Hot 100. The song saw renewed popularity in 2007-08, when Tim McGraw recorded and released a cover version on his album Let It Go.

Eddie Rabbitt version

The song was the first single from Rabbitt's 1979 album Loveline, "Suspicions" reached #1 on the Billboard Hot Country Singles chart in August. "Suspicions" also continued Rabbitt's rise as a crossover artist; peaking at #13 on the Billboard Hot 100, it was his highest peak on the pop chart to that time.  It was also a Top 10 Adult Contemporary hit on the charts of both the U.S. and Canada. 

Rabbitt said that he wrote the song "in five minutes in the studio during a lunch break."

"Suspicions" was named Broadcast Music Incorporated's Song of the Year a year later.

Chart performance

Weekly charts

Year-end charts

Tim McGraw version

In 2007, country music artist Tim McGraw recorded a cover of "Suspicions" for his album Let It Go. McGraw's cover of the song originally peaked at #56 in early 2007 from unsolicited airplay shortly after the release of Let It Go.

Ken Tucker of Billboard described McGraw's cover positively, saying that McGraw sings "like a man who knows what it's like to have heads turn when your wife walks into the room."

McGraw's version was released on November 26, 2007 the fourth single from the album (counting "If You're Reading This", only available on later presses). The cover version peaked at #12 on Billboard Hot Country Songs in February 2008, becoming the second Top 40 hit of Tim's career to miss the Top 10.

Chart performance

References

External links
  

1979 singles
2007 singles
Eddie Rabbitt songs
Tim McGraw songs
Songs written by Eddie Rabbitt
Songs written by David Malloy
Song recordings produced by David Malloy
Song recordings produced by Byron Gallimore
Song recordings produced by Tim McGraw
Music videos directed by Sherman Halsey
Elektra Records singles
Curb Records singles
Songs written by Even Stevens (songwriter)
Songs written by Randy McCormick
1979 songs